Kajali may refer to:

 Kajali language, an Iranian language
 Kajali, Palghar, a village in India